Karolína and Kristýna Plíšková were the defending champions, but chose not to participate.
Alizé Cornet and Yaroslava Shvedova won the title, defeating Lara Arruabarrena and Andreja Klepač in the final, 7–5, 6–4.

Seeds

Draw

References 
 Draw

Hong Kong Tennis Open - Doubles
Hong Kong Open (tennis)
Hong Kong Tennis Open - Doubles